In library automation the initialism JACKPHY refers to a group of language scripts not based on Roman characters, specifically: Japanese, Arabic, Chinese, Korean, Persian, Hebrew, and Yiddish.  Focus on these seven writing systems by Library of Congress, based on sharing bibliographic records using MARC standards, included a partnership between 1979 and 1983 with the Research Libraries Group to develop cataloging capability for non-Roman scripts in the RLIN bibliographic utility.  Ongoing efforts (JACKPHY Plus) enabled functionality for Cyrillic and then Greek in the MARC-8 character set.

See also
 ALA-LC romanization
 Chinese Character Code for Information Interchange

References

External links
 LC Acquisitions and Bibliographic Access: General, Descriptive Cataloging § Non-Latin
 MARC 21 Specifications: Character Sets and Encoding Options

Library automation
Library of Congress
Library cataloging and classification